Raine Square is a property in the central business district of Perth, Western Australia. It is in a block bound by Murray Street, William Street and Wellington Streets. The square is named after Joe and Mary Raine.

History 
The square was formed as a pedestrian way through land surrounded by hotels acquired by the University of Western Australia in the 1960s, including the Wentworth and the Royal Hotels.

The name was used in 1984, and the square officially opened in 1986.

Redevelopment 
The later development of the square involved the construction of a large multi-storey building over what had been the square, maintaining some of the heritage properties that had been on the periphery of the original square.

It has since gone through a range of owners and developments since the original construction.

In 2017 further developments were being made to the complex of properties related to Raine Square.

The new development has proposed features that include re-introducing cinemas into the Perth CBD; the last operational cinemas had closed with Piccadilly cinemas closing in October 2013.

References

External links

 
Landmarks in Perth, Western Australia
Office buildings in Perth, Western Australia
Wellington Street, Perth
Retail buildings in Western Australia
Murray Street, Perth
William Street, Perth
Shopping centres in Perth, Western Australia
State Register of Heritage Places in the City of Perth